Cyperus ovatus is a species of sedge that is native to south eastern parts of North America and some islands of Caribbean.

See also 
 List of Cyperus species

References 

ovatus
Plants described in 1825
Flora of Florida
Flora of Alabama
Flora of Georgia (U.S. state)
Flora of Mississippi
Flora of North Carolina
Flora of South Carolina
Flora of Cuba
Flora of the Bahamas
Flora without expected TNC conservation status